Pedro Soler (born 20 January 1961) is a Colombian former professional racing cyclist. He rode in the 1986 Tour de France.

References

External links

1961 births
Living people
Colombian male cyclists
Place of birth missing (living people)